Roland David Boutin (born November 6, 1957) is a Canadian former ice hockey goaltender who played for the Washington Capitals.  He was selected by the Capitals in the 1977 NHL Entry Draft.

Career
Boutin was born in Westlock, Alberta and raised in Dapp, Alberta. He played junior hockey for the Lethbridge Broncos, Prince Albert Raiders and Swift Current Broncos from 1973 until 1977. 

Boutin turned professional with the Port Huron Flags in 1977–78. From there, Boutin played with several minor league teams with several call-ups to the Washington Capitals in 1978–79, 1979–80 and 1980–81. Boutin's last season was 1983–84, with the Binghamton Whalers.

External links

Profile at hockeydraftcentral.com

1957 births
Living people
Binghamton Whalers players
Canadian ice hockey goaltenders
Ice hockey people from Alberta
Lethbridge Broncos players
People from Westlock County
Swift Current Broncos players
Washington Capitals draft picks
Washington Capitals players